Asygyna huberi is a species of cobweb spider in the family Theridiidae. It is found in Madagascar.

References

Theridiidae
Spiders described in 2006